Spy Pond, also known as Spie Pond in the 17th and 18th centuries, is a  kettle hole pond located near the heart of Arlington, Massachusetts, adjacent to the Minuteman Bikeway.

History

Geological history
Fifty thousand years ago, the area of Arlington where Spy Pond now sits was covered a mile deep in ice by the Wisconsin Glacier. Fifteen thousand years ago, the ice began to recede, leaving depressions or "kettle holes" in its wake. Initially filled with water from the receding glacier itself and then by natural runoff, the kettle holes eventually formed small lakes and ponds throughout the area.

Spy Pond is now fed by a combination of groundwater and surface runoff from the surrounding area. Spy Pond currently has an average depth of 12 feet (3.7 m) and a maximum depth of 36 feet (11 m).

The pond has a two-acre (0.8 ha) island, Elizabeth Island, which was privately owned (but undeveloped) until 2010, when Arlington Land Trust (in collaboration with the Massachusetts Audubon Society) agreed to purchase the property and set it aside for conservation.

Cultural history
On April 19, 1775, Mother Batherick, an elderly woman who liked to gather dandelions by Spy Pond, managed to corral and take prisoner six Revolutionary War Redcoats who were fleeing their captured supply train.

In 1850, the Spy Pond Water Company began piping water to West Cambridge. The Spy Pond Water Company changed its name to the Arlington Lake Company when West Cambridge was renamed Arlington in 1867.

During the Civil War the Union Army conducted training at Camp Sheppard near Spy Pond and following the war civilian rifle matches were conducted by the Massachusetts Rifle Association from 1875 through 1876 before their move to Woburn, Massachusetts.

The 19th century also saw Spy Pond become an industrial center as entrepreneurs sought to harvest the benefits of this natural resource for export. Spy Pond became a source for ice in the winter, cut into huge blocks for shipping, and pure water for nearby Boston in the summer. Businesses shipped Spy Pond ice as far away as India, installing huge amounts of infrastructure and equipment in the Arlington area in the process.  This led to the development of the local railroad and large-scale manufacture of ice tools.

In the 1970s, the Wetland Protection Act was passed classifying Spy Pond as a great pond under Massachusetts law. Despite this classification, the Commonwealth of Massachusetts uses Spy Pond for drainage from Route 2, resulting in what Cori Beckwith, administrator of the Arlington Conservation Commission, describes as a "slightly hazardous" sandbar and states that "its  costly" to remove.

Wildlife

Birds

Bird enthusiasts have tracked the native and migratory bird populations of Spy Pond for a number of years. They report that almost one hundred and twenty species of birds make their home in and along its shores at some point in the year. This list includes 32 swimmers and 86 non-swimmers.

Among the bird population, Canada geese are the most notable and controversial residents.

Fish

Spy Pond was stocked with fish through the 1990s, but budget cuts have meant no stocking since then. The pond contains a variety of species, including American eel, bluegill, carp, largemouth bass, white perch, yellow perch, pumpkinseed, black crappie, white crappie, gizzard shad, and tiger muskellunge.  However, according to Rodney Zukowski, owner of Arlington Bait and Tackle, given the 10–12 year lifespan of tiger muskellunge and their inability to reproduce, it is believed Spy Pond no longer contains them, as the last stocking was over 15 years ago.  Bucket biologists  have illegally introduced northern pike in the last few years, some reaching more than 40 inches.

See also
Ponds
List of Massachusetts birds

References

External links

MinuteMan Bikeway
Friends of Spy Pond Park

Lakes of Middlesex County, Massachusetts
Massachusetts natural resources
Arlington, Massachusetts
Ice trade
Ponds of Massachusetts